Systematic Entomology is a scientific journal covering the field of systematic entomology, published by the Royal Entomological Society of London. Having begun in 1932 as Proceedings of the Royal Entomological Society of London, Series B: Taxonomy, the title was changed to Journal of Entomology, Series B: Taxonomy in 1971, starting with volume 40. After volume 44 in 1976, the journal became Systematic Entomology, starting again with volume 1.

According to the Journal Citation Reports, the journal has a 2020 impact factor of 3.844. It is indexed in the following bibliographic databases:
Academic Search
AGRICOLA
Aquatic Sciences and Fisheries Abstracts
BIOBASE
Biological Abstracts
BIOSIS Previews
CAB Direct
CSA Biological Sciences Database
CSA Environmental Sciences & Pollution Management Database
Current Contents
Embiology
IBIDS
InfoTrac
Journal Citation Reports
Science Citation Index
The Zoological Record

See also
List of entomology journals

References

Entomology journals and magazines
Publications established in 1932
Quarterly journals
1932 establishments in the United Kingdom
Royal Entomological Society
Wiley (publisher) academic journals
Academic journals associated with learned and professional societies of the United Kingdom